The Postgraduate Center for Mental Health (PGCMH) is an organization that provides mental healthcare services in New York City. It was founded in 1945 by psychiatrist Lewis Wolberg to provide psychological care to World War II veterans. Currently it provides inpatient and outpatient clinical mental healthcare services, and also provides transitional and permanent housing for people with severe and persistent mental illnesses.

A 2016 audit of the organization carried out by the Office of the New York City Comptroller found several financial irregularities as well as health and safety violations in apartments managed by PGCMH.

References 

Mental health organizations in New York (state)
Organizations based in New York City